Final results for the boxing competition at the 1952 Summer Olympics. The events were held at Messuhalli. From this edition of the Olympic Games, the bronze medal match was abolished.  No bronze medals were awarded, but their flags were on the podium.  In 1970, the AIBA and IOC agreed to retroactively award bronze medals to losing semifinalists.

Medal summary

Medal table

References

External links
 Official Olympic Report

 
1952 Summer Olympics events
1952
1952 in boxing